Zhao Tuo  was a Qin dynasty Chinese general and first emperor of Nanyue.  He participated in the conquest of the Baiyue peoples of Guangdong, Guangxi and Northern Vietnam. After the fall of the Qin, he established the independent kingdom of Nanyue with its capital in Panyu (now Guangzhou) in 204 BCE. Some traditional Vietnamese history scholars considered him an emperor of Vietnam and the founder of the Triệu dynasty, other historians contested that he was a foreign invader.

Life

Nanyue 
The territory of those conquered Yues was divided into the three provinces of Guilin, Nanhai, and Xiang. Zhao served as magistrate in the province of Nanhai until his military commander, Ren Xiao, fell ill. Before he died, Ren advised Zhao not to get involved in the affairs of the declining Qin, and instead set up his own independent kingdom centered around the geographically remote and isolated city of Panyu (modern Guangzhou). Ren gave Zhao full authority to act as military commander of Nanhai and died shortly afterwards. Zhao immediately closed off the roads at Hengpu, Yangshan, and Huangqi. Using one excuse or another he eliminated the Qin officials and replaced them with his own appointees. By the time the Qin fell in 206 BC, Zhao had also conquered the provinces of Guilin and Xiang. He declared himself King Wu of Nanyue (Southern Yue).

Conflict with the Han 
In June or July 196 BC, Emperor Gaozu of Han dispatched Lu Jia to recognize Zhao Tuo as king of Nanyue. Lu gave Zhao a seal legitimizing him as king of Nanyue in return for his nominal submission to the Han.

In 185 BC, Empress Lü's officials outlawed trade of iron and horses with Nanyue. Zhao Tuo retaliated by proclaiming himself Emperor Wu of Nanyue and attacking the neighboring kingdom of Changsha, taking a few border towns. In 181 BC, Zhou Zao was dispatched by Empress Lü to attack Nanyue, but the heat and dampness caused many of his officers and men to fall ill, and he failed to make it across the mountains into enemy territory. Zhao began to menace the neighboring kingdoms of Minyue, Western Ou, and Luo. After securing their submission he began passing out edicts in a similar manner to the Han emperor.

In late 180 BC, Emperor Wen of Han made efforts to appease Zhao. Learning that Zhao's parents were buried in Zhending, he set aside a town close by just to take care of their graves. Zhao's cousins were appointed to high offices at the Han court. He also withdrew the army stationed in Changsha on the Han-Nanyue border. In response, Zhao rescinded his claims as emperor while communicating with the Han. However, he continued using the title of emperor within his kingdom. Tribute bearing envoys from Nanyue were sent to the Han and thus the iron trade was resumed.

Conquest of Âu Lạc 
Having mobilized his armies for war with the Han dynasty, Zhao Tuo found the conquest of Âu Lạc both "tempting and feasible".

The details of the campaign are not authentically recorded. Zhao Tuo's early setbacks and eventual victory against King An Dương were mentioned in Records of the Outer Territories of the Jiao province (交州外域記) and Records [about the Era] of Jin Taikang (晉太康記). Records of the Grand Historian mentioned neither King An Dương nor Zhao Tuo's military conquest of Âu Lạc; just that after Empress Lü's death (180 BCE), Zhao Tuo used his own troops to menace and used wealth to bribe the Minyue, the Western Ou, and the Luo (Âu Lạc) into submission. The campaign against the Âu Lạc inspired a legend whose theme is the transfer of the turtle claw-triggered crossbow from King An Dương to Zhao Tuo. According to this legend, ownership of the crossbow conferred the political power. As described in one account, Cao Lỗ is quoted as saying:“He who is able to hold this crossbow rules the realm; he who is not able to hold this crossbow will perish.”

Unsuccessful on the battlefield against the supernatural crossbow, Zhao Tuo asked for a truce and sent his son Zhong Shi, to submit to King An Dương to serve him. There, he and King An Dương's daughter, Mỵ Châu, fell in love and were married. A vestige of the matrilocal organization demanded that the husband came to live in the residence of his wife's family. As a result, they resided at An Dương's court until Zhong Shi managed to lay his hands upon the magic crossbow that was the source of King An Dương's power. Meanwhile, King An Dương treated Cao Lỗ disrespectfully, and he abandoned him.

Zhong Shi had Mỵ Châu show him her father's sacred crossbow, at with point he secretly changed its trigger, thus neutralizing its special powers. He stole the turtle claw, rendering the crossbow useless, then returned to his father, who thereupon launched new attack on Âu Lạc and this time defeated King An Dương. History records that, in his defeat, the King jumped into the ocean to commit suicide. In some versions, he was told by the turtle about his daughter's betrayal and killed his own daughter before killing himself. A legend, however, discloses that a golden turtle emerged from the water and guided him into the watery realm.

Zhao Tuo subsequently incorporated the regions into his Nanyue domain, but left the indigenous chiefs in control of the population with the royal court in Cổ Loa. For the first time, the region formed part of a polity headed by a Chinese ruler. He posted two legates to supervise the Âu Lạc lords, one in the Red River Delta, which was named Jiaozhi, and one in the Mã and Cả River, which was named Jiuzhen. Some records suggest that he also invested a king at Cổ Loa who continued to preside over the Âu Lạc lords. The legates established commercial outposts accessible by sea.

Death 
Zhao Tuo died in 137 BC and was succeeded by his grandson, Zhao Mo.

Legacy 
 His memorial is in Tuocheng Town, Longchuan County, Guangdong.

See also 

 History of China
 History of Vietnam
 Qin's campaign against the Yue tribes
 Nanyue
 Triệu dynasty
 Phiên Ngung
 Trọng Thuỷ
 Han-Nanyue War
 An Dương Vương
 Âu Lạc
 Phiên Ngung Palace
 Museum of the Mausoleum of King Triệu Mạt
 Luobowan Tomb No.1
 Đông Sơn culture
 Changsha (state)
 Minyue
 Yelang
 Bách Việt

Citations

References 

Qin dynasty generals
Vietnamese kings
Year of birth unknown
Politicians from Shijiazhuang
Qin dynasty politicians
Generals from Hebei
Nanyue
137 BC deaths
2nd-century BC Chinese monarchs
3rd-century BC Chinese monarchs
Vietnamese people of Chinese descent
Founding monarchs